Karlo Alexei Bendigo Nograles (born September 3, 1976) is a Filipino lawyer and politician serving as the Chairperson of the Civil Service Commission since March 4, 2022. He was previously the Cabinet Secretary (2018–2022) and acting Presidential Spokesperson (2021–2022) in the Duterte administration. He was also the co-chair and spokesperson of the Inter-Agency Task Force for the Management of Emerging Infectious Diseases (IATF-EID) in the Philippine government's response to the COVID-19 pandemic and chairman of the government's Inter-Agency Task Force on Zero Hunger. He was the representative of Davao City's 1st district from 2010 to 2018.

He is an advocate of Education for All, a global movement that supports farmers and agriculture-related programs and gives more opportunities to provinces. In the 2016 Philippine presidential elections, Nograles was among those who encouraged then-Davao City Mayor Rodrigo Duterte to run for president. He was a member of the National Unity Party (NUP) before joining PDP–Laban in 2017.

Early life and education
Karlo Nograles was born on September 3, 1976, in Davao City to Prospero Nograles, a lawyer who would later become a Speaker of the House of Representatives, and Rhodora Burgos Bendigo Nograles. He has three siblings.

Nograles attended grade school in Ateneo de Davao University from 1983 to 1989, where he graduated valedictorian of his class. In high school, he was admitted to the Philippine Science High School Main Campus, graduating in 1993 and receiving a C.A.T. Leadership Award. He proceeded to the Ateneo de Manila University for college, graduating in 1997 with a Bachelor of Science in Management Engineering degree. He finished his Juris Doctor degree in 2003 at the Ateneo de Manila Law School.

Political career 
Nograles' career in politics began when he served as the Chief-of-Staff of his father who was then serving as the member of the House of Representatives. In 2010, he was elected as the representative of the 1st district of Davao City. He ran again in the 2013 elections and successfully won another term. In his second term as representative, he served as the Chairman of the House Committee on Labor and Employment.

He served his third and final term in the 17th Congress, having run unopposed during the 2016 elections. During this time, he served as the Chairman of the House Committee on Appropriations. As chairman, Nograles was notable for allocating the budget for free higher education in accordance with the Universal Access to Quality Tertiary Education Act. Before 2017 ended, he appropriated  for the 2018 national budget. Initially ridden with conflicting proposals with the Senate's version of the bill and budget cuts, the 'impasse' plaguing the proposed budget was resolved after a Bicameral Conference Committee meeting.

In 2018, also as appropriations chair, he allocated a ₱25-billion budget for the Armed Forces of the Philippines (AFP) modernization program. This initiative covered the acquisition of brand new attack helicopters, tanks, and other military hardware. He also allotted funds amounting to ₱64.2 billion for the salary increase of military and uniformed personnel.

In accordance with his Free Irrigation Law which was signed in February 2018, he allocated  for irrigation fee subsidies for 2018, which was higher than the  irrigation budget for 2017.

Nograles was also the author of the Green Jobs Act, which granted special tax deductions and duty-free importation of capital equipment for companies that will help create employment that contributes to preserving or restoring the quality of the environment; the JobStart Philippines Act which enhanced opportunities and employment facilitation for Filipino youth through enhanced knowledge and skills acquisition through formal and technical education and a shortened school-to-work transition to increase chances of productive employment; and Republic Act No. 10741 that strengthened the National Labor Relations Commission.

Committee membership

While Nograles is known as the Chairman of the House Committee on Appropriations, he was also part of the following committees:

Personal life
Nograles is married to Marga Maceda Montemayor, a social entrepreneur and an advocate for women and Mindanao. They have three children.

He is a member of the Aquila Legis fraternity and of the Global Organization of Parliamentarians Against Corruption. He also has links to Junior Chamber International.

He is the recipient of the Golden Globe Annual Award for Excellence in Public Service in 2015 and 2016. He was also awarded the Outstanding Congressman Award in 2012 and again in 2015 by Superbrands Marketing International. Nograles also took part as chairman of the Board of Jurors tasked to judge the awardees of the 2017 Metro Manila Film Festival.

External links 
 Official website of Karlo Nograles
 Congress of the Philippines House of representatives

References 

|-

|-

|-

|-

|-

|-

|-

|-

1976 births
Living people
21st-century Filipino lawyers
Members of the House of Representatives of the Philippines from Davao City
PDP–Laban politicians
People from Davao City
Ateneo de Davao University alumni
Ateneo de Manila University alumni
National Unity Party (Philippines) politicians
Cabinet Secretaries of the Philippines
Duterte administration cabinet members
Chairpersons of constitutional commissions of the Philippines